Antonio Severini (died 1472) was a Roman Catholic prelate who served as Bishop of Gubbio (1444–1472) and Bishop of Cagli (1439–1444).

Biography
On 14 Dec 1439, Antonio Severini was appointed during the papacy of Pope Eugene IV as Bishop of Cagli.
On 15 Jul 1444, he was appointed during the papacy of Pope Eugene IV as Bishop of Gubbio.
He served as Bishop of Gubbio until his death on 4 Apr 1472. 
While bishop, he was the principal co-consecrator of Wilhelm Mader, Auxiliary Bishop of Augsburg (1447); and André da Mule, Archbishop of Bar (1448).

References

External links and additional sources

15th-century Italian Roman Catholic bishops
Bishops appointed by Pope Eugene IV
1472 deaths